The Wrestler is a 2008 American sports psychological drama film directed by Darren Aronofsky and written by Robert Siegel. The film stars Mickey Rourke, Marisa Tomei, and Evan Rachel Wood. Rourke plays an aging professional wrestler who, despite his failing health and waning fame, continues to wrestle in an attempt to cling to the success of his 1980s heyday. He also tries to mend his relationship with his estranged daughter and to find romance with a woman who works as a stripper.

Production began in January 2008 and Fox Searchlight Pictures acquired rights to distribute the film in the United States; it received a limited release on December 17, 2008, and was released nationwide on January 23, 2009. It was released on DVD and Blu-ray Disc on April 21, 2009, in the United States. It was released in the United Kingdom on January 16, 2009.

The film received universal acclaim and won the Golden Lion Award at the 65th Venice International Film Festival, where it premiered. Film critic Roger Ebert called it one of the year's best films, while Rotten Tomatoes reported that 98% of critics gave the film positive reviews. The success of the film revitalized the career of Mickey Rourke, who went on to receive a BAFTA award, a Golden Globe Award, an Independent Spirit Award and an Oscar nomination for Best Actor. Tomei also received an Academy Award nomination for Best Supporting Actress.

Plot
Professional wrestler Robin Ramzinski, better known by his ring name Randy "The Ram" Robinson, rose to fame in the 1980s. Now past his prime, Randy wrestles on weekends for independent promotions in New Jersey while living in a trailer park and working part-time at a supermarket under Wayne, a demeaning manager who mocks Randy's wrestling background. As a regular at a strip club, Randy befriends a stripper named Cassidy who, like Randy, is past her prime. After winning a local match, Randy agrees to a proposed 20th-anniversary rematch with his most notable opponent, "The Ayatollah", which Randy hopes could return him to stardom.

Randy intensifies his training, which includes steroid injections. After wrestling in a hardcore match, Randy suffers a heart attack backstage and undergoes coronary artery bypass surgery. His doctor informs him that he nearly died and has to stop taking steroids, and also warns Randy not to wrestle anymore, as his heart can no longer handle the exertion. Reluctantly, Randy decides to retire and begins working a full-time shift at the supermarket's deli counter.

At Cassidy's suggestion, Randy visits his estranged daughter Stephanie, whom he had abandoned when she was a child, but she rebuffs him. While helping Randy buy a gift for Stephanie, Cassidy reveals that she has a son. Randy makes romantic advances toward her, which she rejects on the grounds of her job. Later, Randy gives the gift to his daughter and apologizes for abandoning her. The two bond over a visit to a beachfront boardwalk, where he often took her as a child, and agree to meet for dinner on the coming Saturday. 

Randy goes to Cassidy's strip club to thank her, but she once more rejects him, resulting in a heated exchange. Upset, Randy goes to see a wrestling match and finds solace in his wrestling friends. While at a bar with them, he gets drunk, snorts cocaine, has sex with a woman in the women's restroom, then wakes up in her bedroom the next morning. Exhausted, he sleeps the entire day and misses his dinner with Stephanie. He goes to her house to apologize, but she angrily tells him she hates him and never wants to see him again.

At the deli counter, a patron recognizes Randy as the wrestler, though he denies it. The customer persists, which agitates Randy, who then cuts his own hand on the slicer and promptly quits on the spot, going into a rampage in the store while insulting Wayne and the customers. Spurred by the fan's recognition of him and with nothing left, Randy decides to return to wrestling and reschedules the rematch with The Ayatollah. He reconciles with Cassidy, who has also just quit her job, though she begs him not to wrestle because of his heart condition and pleads with him to cancel the match. However, Randy disregards her advice, explaining to her that he belongs in the ring with his fans and fellow wrestlers who love and respect him.

As he wrestles, Randy begins to feel chest pain and becomes unsteady. Noticing this, The Ayatollah urges him to initiate the pin and end the match. Randy refuses, however, and climbs the top rope for his signature finishing move, a diving headbutt called the "Ram Jam". He looks over and sees Cassidy has left. As the crowd cheers his name, Randy, with tears in his eyes, leaps from the top rope.

Cast

 Mickey Rourke as Robin Ramzinski / Randy 'The Ram' Robinson
 Marisa Tomei as Pam / Cassidy
 Evan Rachel Wood as Stephanie Ramzinski
 Mark Margolis as Lenny
 Todd Barry as Wayne
 Judah Friedlander as Scott Brumberg
 Ernest Miller as Bob / 'The Ayatollah'
 Ajay Naidu as Medic
 Wass Stevens as Nick Volpe
 John D'Leo as Adam
 Gregg Bello as JAPW Promoter Larry Cohen
 Armin Amiri as Dr. Moayedizadeh

Professional wrestlers who appeared in the film include: Robbie E, Necro Butcher, Nick Berk, The Blue Meanie, Sabian, Nate Hatred, Ron Killings, L.A. Smooth, Jay Lethal, Johnny Valiant, Jim Powers, Austin Aries, Claudio Castagnoli, Larry Sweeney, Paul E. Normous, Romeo Roselli, John Zandig, Chuck Taylor, Nigel McGuinness, D. J. Hyde, Kit Cope, Drew Gulak, Bobby Dempsey, Judas Young, Pappadon, and Jay Santana.

Production

The Wrestler was written by Robert D. Siegel, a former writer for The Onion, and entered development at director Darren Aronofsky's Protozoa Pictures. Nicolas Cage entered negotiations in October 2007 to star as Randy. The following month Cage left the project, and Mickey Rourke replaced him in the lead role. According to Aronofsky, Cage pulled out of the movie because Aronofsky wanted Rourke as the lead character. Aronofsky stated that Cage was "a complete gentleman, and he understood that my heart was with Mickey and he stepped aside. I have so much respect for Nic Cage as an actor and I think it really could have worked with Nic but, you know, Nic was incredibly supportive of Mickey and he is old friends with Mickey and really wanted to help with this opportunity, so he pulled himself out of the race." In a 2009 interview with Access Hollywood, Cage denied Aronofsky's account, stating that "I wasn't, quote, 'dropped' from the movie. I resigned from the movie because I didn't think I had enough time to achieve the look of the wrestler who was on steroids, which I would never do."

When first approached for the lead role, Rourke was initially reluctant, stating, "I didn't really care for the script, but I wanted to work with Darren and I kind of thought that whoever wrote the script hadn't spent as much time as I had around these kind of people and he wouldn't have spoken the way the dude was speaking. And so Darren let me rewrite all my parts and he put the periods in and crossed the T's. So once we made that change, I was okay with it."

Wrestler Hulk Hogan claimed in 2012 on The Howard Stern Show that he was also offered the role of Randy "The Ram" Robinson. Hogan claims he turned down the role because he felt he wasn't the right man to portray the character. Aronofsky disputed Hogan's claims, stating on his personal Twitter page that, "...the role of the Wrestler was always [Rourke's]; it was never Hulk Hogan's as he claims on [The Howard Stern Show]."

The roughly 40-day shoot began in January 2008, with filming taking place on 16mm film throughout New Jersey in Elizabeth, Linden, Rahway, Roselle Park, Hasbrouck Heights, Garfield, Asbury Park, Dover, a supermarket in Bayonne where Rourke served and improvised with real customers, and in New York. Scenes were also shot at The Arena in Philadelphia. The shoot wrapped up in March.

Afa Anoa'i, a former professional wrestler, was hired to train Rourke for his role. Anoa'i brought his two main trainers, Jon Trosky and Tom Farra, to work with Rourke for eight weeks. Both trainers also have parts in the film.

One scene features a fictional Nintendo Entertainment System video game called Wrestle Jam '88. It starred the characters of Robinson and The Ayatollah. Aronofsky requested a fully functioning game for the actors to play. Programmer Randall Furino and the film's title designer Kristyn Hume created a playable demo with a working interface and AI routines that also featured 1980s era-appropriate graphics and music.

To add more realism, the locker room scenes were improvised for Rourke and others to look as if they were actually socializing. Some of the deli scenes were improvised because Aronofsky was filming Rourke actually working there.

Marisa Tomei was made to do 36 takes to get her pole dancing right.

Music

Clint Mansell, the composer for Aronofsky's previous films, π, Requiem for a Dream, and The Fountain, reprised his role as composer for The Wrestler. Slash played the guitars on the score. A new Bruce Springsteen song, also titled "The Wrestler", plays over the film's closing credits. Springsteen wrote the song while on tour in Europe after receiving a letter and a copy of the script from Rourke.

The Guns N' Roses song "Sweet Child o' Mine" is played during Randy's ring entrance at the end of the film. In his Golden Globe Award acceptance speech, Rourke mentioned that Axl Rose donated the song for free due to the film's modest budget, and the film's closing credits thank Rose for this. Rourke had used the same song as his intro music during his stint as a boxer in the early 1990s. In the film, his character Randy even mocks one of Axl Rose's biggest rivals in the early 1990s popular music scene, Kurt Cobain.

Also featured in the film are two Ratt songs ("Round and Round" and "I'm Insane"), the Quiet Riot song "Metal Health" (which is Randy's entrance song except for the last match), the FireHouse song "Don't Walk Away", the Slaughter song "Dangerous", the Scorpions song "Animal Magnetism", "Balls to the Wall" by Accept, "Soundtrack to a War" by Rhino Bucket and the Cinderella song "Don't Know What You Got (Till It's Gone)". The two Ratt tunes are actually recordings by Rat Attack, a project featuring Ratt lead singer Stephen Pearcy and guitarists George Lynch (Dokken) and Tracii Guns (L.A. Guns). The Madonna song "Jump" is played in the bar scene. The Birdman and Lil Wayne song "Stuntin' Like My Daddy" can be heard in the strip club. Also in the film is a song called "Let Your Freak Out" by independent Toronto singer-songwriter Deesha which can be heard during the strip club scene where Marisa Tomei's character is having an emotional conversation with Mickey Rourke's character.

In the Toronto International Film Festival interview conducted by James Rocchi, Aronofsky credited the 1957 Charles Mingus song "The Clown", an instrumental piece with a poem read over the music about a clown who accidentally discovers the bloodlust of the crowds and eventually kills himself in performance, as a major source of inspiration for the movie. Aronofsky also said the brief reprise of Senator and Presidential-candidate John McCain's "Bomb bomb Iran" to the tune of The Beach Boys' "Barbara Ann" in the movie evolved as improvisation on the set. The Ayatollah wrestling character's persona had developed more than 20 years before but, in part through this musical moment and its connection with the character, came to still feel appropriate to Aronofsky in 2008.

Promotion

WWE helped promote the film through an on-screen angle (a fictional storyline used in wrestling). This involved the heel Chris Jericho criticizing legendary retired wrestlers such as Ric Flair, who he felt were embarrassing themselves, as well as Mickey Rourke for his portrayal in The Wrestler. At the 15th Screen Actors Guild Awards, Rourke announced he would be competing at WrestleMania 25, specifically targeting Jericho. The announcement led to a confrontation between the two on Larry King Live, which showed signs of second thoughts from Rourke. On January 28, it was announced through Rourke's spokesperson that the actor would not compete at WrestleMania, and he was soon after announced instead as a guest.

Rourke was also invited to the 2009 WWE Hall of Fame induction ceremony the night before WrestleMania. The angle culminated the following night where Jericho faced Ricky Steamboat, Roddy Piper, and Jimmy Snuka in a handicap match. After his victory, Jericho dismantled Flair and challenged Rourke, who finally entered the ring and punched him out. Flair then congratulated Rourke.

Reception

Film critics
The Wrestler received almost universal critical acclaim. Rotten Tomatoes reported that 98% of critics gave the film positive reviews based upon a sample of 233 reviews, with an average rating of 8.40/10, and gave it a Golden Tomato for best drama of 2008. The critical consensus states that "Mickey Rourke gives a performance for the ages in The Wrestler, a richly affecting, heart-wrenching yet ultimately rewarding drama." At Metacritic, which assigns a rating out of 100 to reviews from mainstream critics, the film has received an average score of 80, based on 36 reviews, signifying "generally favorable reviews". Alonso Duralde, of MSNBC, said, "Rourke's work transcends mere stunt-casting; his performance is a howl of pain that seems to come from a very real place."

Todd McCarthy, of Variety, said, "Rourke creates a galvanizing, humorous, deeply moving portrait that instantly takes its place among the great, iconic screen performances." Ben Mankiewicz, from At the Movies, said, "To put it simply, this is the best film I've seen this year." Le Monde praised the film for melding European film style with an American plot, and stated that "Mickey Rourke's performance in 'The Wrestler' is a continuous celebration of the burdens and splendors of the profession of performance." One other French film critic, Philippe Azoury, praised its portrayal of "the American heartland" as what he viewed as a bleak wasteland. 

Although The Wrestler was not technically in Roger Ebert's "Best Films" list, he includes a note at the bottom of his review: "'The Wrestler' is one of the year's best films. It wasn't on my 'best films' list for complicated and boring reasons."

Professional wrestling industry

Prominent wrestling figures have commented on the film. During an NPR interview, Aronofsky remarked  on WWE chairman Vince McMahon's feelings on The Wrestler:

WWE Hall of Famer Bret "The Hitman" Hart, who was a multi-time world champion in both WWE and WCW, enjoyed The Wrestler and applauded Rourke's "clairvoyant" performance, but called the film a "dark misinterpretation" of the business. He asserted: "Randy "The Ram" Robinson was a main-eventer who sold out Madison Square Garden. So was I ... Although the film speaks superbly to the speed bumps all pro wrestlers navigate, I'm happy to report most of us don't swerve off the road quite so severely." WWE play-by-play commentator Jim Ross called it a "really strong, dramatic film that depicts how people who are obsessed with their own lives and their careers can self-destruct".

Former WWE and TNA world champion Mick Foley enjoyed the film, saying: "Within five [minutes], I had completely forgotten I was looking at Mickey Rourke. That guy on the screen simply was Randy 'the Ram' Robinson." WWE Hall of Famer "Rowdy" Roddy Piper was said to have been highly emotional after watching a screening of the film. Aronofsky said of Piper: "He loved it. He broke down and cried in Mickey's arms, so he was psyched that this story was finally told." Insights on the film from Roddy Piper and other former pro wrestlers can be seen in Fox Searchlight Pictures's "Wrestler Round Table", which was included on the Blu-ray release of the film.

Professional wrestling manager, color commentator and former promoter Jim Cornette criticized the film for being an unrelentingly depressing view of the professional wrestling world, saying it was neither realistic nor accurate of the profession for most wrestlers involved in it.

Controversy in Iran
In March 2009, Javad Shamaqdari, cultural adviser to the-then Iranian President Mahmoud Ahmadinejad, demanded an apology from a delegation of Academy of Motion Picture Arts and Sciences actors and producers visiting Iran for what he characterized as negative and unfair portrayals of Iran in The Wrestler and other Hollywood films.

Top ten lists
The film appeared on many critics' top ten lists of the best films of 2008.

 1st – Matt Cale, Ruthless Reviews
 1st – Ben Mankiewicz, At the Movies
 1st – Joshua Rothkopf, Time Out
 1st – Owen Gleiberman, Entertainment Weekly
 2nd – Marc Doyle, Metacritic
 2nd – Peter Hartlaub, San Francisco Chronicle
 3rd – Anthony Lane, The New Yorker
 3rd – Marc Savlov, The Austin Chronicle
 3rd – Peter Vonder Haar, Film Threat
 4th – Richard Roeper, Chicago Sun-Times
 4th – Ben Lyons, At the Movies
 4th – David Denby, The New Yorker
 5th – James Berardinelli, ReelViews

 5th – Mick LaSalle, San Francisco Chronicle
 6th – Ty Burr, The Boston Globe
 7th – David Ansen, Newsweek
 7th – Ray Bennett, The Hollywood Reporter
 7th – V.A. Musetto, New York Post
 8th – Premiere
 8th – Nathan Rabin, The A.V. Club
 9th – Elizabeth Weitzman, New York Daily News
 9th – Josh Rosenblatt, The Austin Chronicle
 10th – Dana Stevens, Slate
 10th – Joe Morgenstern, The Wall Street Journal
 10th – Joe Neumaier, New York Daily News

Accolades

References

External links

 
 
 
 

2008 films
2000s English-language films
2008 independent films
2000s sports drama films
American independent films
American sports drama films
BAFTA winners (films)
Fox Searchlight Pictures films
Film controversies in Iran
Films about old age
Films directed by Darren Aronofsky
Films featuring a Best Drama Actor Golden Globe winning performance
Films produced by Darren Aronofsky
Films scored by Clint Mansell
Films set in New Jersey
Films shot in New Jersey
Films shot in New York (state)
Films shot in Pennsylvania
Golden Lion winners
Independent Spirit Award for Best Film winners
Professional wrestling films
Protozoa Pictures films
Films about self-harm
2008 drama films
Films about striptease
American psychological drama films
2000s psychological drama films
Films about father–daughter relationships
Films shot in 16 mm film
2000s American films